Elefthero is a village and a community of the Grevena municipality. Before the 2011 local government reform it was a part of the municipality of Grevena, of which it was a municipal district. The 2011 census recorded 57 residents in the village and 229 residents in the community. The community of Elefthero covers an area of 11.177 km2.

Administrative division
The community of Elefthero consists of two separate settlements: 
Elefthero (population 57)
Elefthero Prosfygon (population 172)
The aforementioned population figures are as of 2011.

Population
According to the 2011 census, the population of the settlement of Elefthero was 57 people, an decrease of almost 31% compared to the previous census of 2001. The respective community had a small population decrease of 2%.

See also
 List of settlements in the Grevena regional unit

References

Populated places in Grevena (regional unit)
Villages in Greece